Julia Frandsen Knight is an American mathematician, specializing in model theory and computability theory. She is the Charles L. Huisking Professor of Mathematics at the University of Notre Dame and director of the graduate program in mathematics there.

Education 
Knight did her undergraduate studies at Utah State University, graduating in 1964, and earned her Ph.D. from the University of California, Berkeley in 1972 under the supervision of Robert Lawson Vaught.

Honors and awards 
In 2012, she became a fellow of the American Mathematical Society and she was elected to be the 30th president of the Association for Symbolic Logic. She was named MSRI Simons Professor for Fall 2020.

In 2014, Knight held the Gödel Lecture, titled Computable structure theory and formulas of special forms.

References

Year of birth missing (living people)
Living people
20th-century American mathematicians
21st-century American mathematicians
American women mathematicians
Utah State University alumni
University of California, Berkeley alumni
University of Notre Dame faculty
Model theorists
Fellows of the American Mathematical Society
Tarski lecturers
20th-century women mathematicians
21st-century women mathematicians
20th-century American women
21st-century American women
Gödel Lecturers